"Can't Repeat" is a single by American punk rock band the Offspring. "Can't Repeat" was released to radio on May 10, 2005. It is the first track on their compilation album, Greatest Hits, and is its only original track. It was released on June 20, 2005, a day before the album was released.

Track listing

Music video
The music video for the song simply featured the band playing in a derelict room, and it received little airtime on MTV. An alternate version was made showing actors looking back on photographs and memories, reflecting the song's subject matter, though this was very rarely shown. It was the second and final video to feature Atom Willard playing the drums.

The original music video starts with Kriesel playing the opening melody with his special, "k-covered" bass, hence to his nickname of Greg K., then Willard comes in, and finally Holland and Noodles. The melody stays about the same throughout the song.

DVD appearances
The music video also appears on the Complete Music Video Collection DVD. It was released in 2005.

Charts

References

External links

The Offspring songs
2005 singles
Songs written by Dexter Holland
2005 songs
Columbia Records singles